Helmut Bakaitis (born 26 September 1944) ) is a German-born Australian director, actor and screenwriter and playwright.
He is best known for his role in The Matrix Reloaded and The Matrix Revolutions as the character the Architect.

Early life and education 
Bakaitis was born in Dresden or Lauban, Lower Silesia, Germany (now Lubań, Poland), to Lithuanian parents. He was educated at Fort Street High School, Sydney.

He graduated from Australia's National Institute of Dramatic Art (NIDA) in 1965.

Career 

He held the position of Head of Directing at NIDA for nine years until 2007. He then started teaching directing at Australian Academy of Dramatic Art (AADA), now the Australian Institute of Music - Dramatic Arts (AIMDA).

Credits

Actor

Screenwriter
 Shirley Thompson vs. the Aliens (1972)

Director 

 The Christian Brothers, Q Theatre, Penrith (1991)

References

External links
 

1944 births
Living people
People from Lubań
People from the Province of Silesia
Australian male film actors
Australian male television actors
Australian screenwriters
Australian people of Lithuanian descent
German people of Lithuanian descent
German emigrants to Australia